The Okanagan Indian Band is a First Nations government in the Canadian province of British Columbia, located in the city of Vernon in the northern Okanagan Valley.  The band is a member government of the Okanagan Nation Alliance.

Current chief and council: 
Chief- Byron Louis
Governors-in-council: 
Allan Louis, Daniel Anthony Wilson, Garett Johnny Lawrence, Leland Wilson, Shawna Whitney, Sheldon Louis, Dean Louis, Valerie Chiba, Cindy Brewer, Tim Issac,

Population
As of October 2010, 809 of the Okanagan Band's population live on one of the band's own reserves, 430 men and 379 women, with 86 people living on reserves governed by other bands (36 men, 50 women).  900 people are living off-reserve.  The band's total population is 1,795.

Indian Reserves

Indian Reserves under the administration of the band are:

Duck Lake Indian Reserve No. 7, on the north shore of Ellison Lake and on the banks of Vernon Creek, 179.10 ha.
Harris Indian Reserve No. 3, two miles southeast of Otter Lake, 64.80 ha.
Okanagan Indian Reserve No. 1, in the Okanagan Valley between Okanagan Lake and the Salmon River, 10302 ha.
Otter Lake Indian Reserve No. 2, at the south end of Otter Lake, nine miles north of Vernon, 25 ha.
Priest's Valley Indian Reserve No. 6, on Vernon Creek at its mouth on the east side of Okanagan Lake, southwest of Vernon, 33.60 ha.
Swan Lake Indian Reserve No. 4, on the north shore of Swan Lake, 32.20 ha.

Environmental problems
Unexploded ordnance (UXO) has littered OKIB land at Madeline Lake and Goose Lake since the Boer War in 1906. Canadian soldiers were trained to fire "live mortars, grenades and other munitions, including white phosphorus".  In 2014, over 70 years old live mortars were found; a clean up agreement specifies that beginning in 2015 ten band members will be trained to become UXO technicians.

Recent history

On February 22, 2010 the Okanagan Indian Band began blockading Tolko Industries Ltd.'s access to the Browns Creek watershed to protest logging. The blockade is supported by the Union of BC Indian Chiefs.

In 2014 OKIB requested that the defunct Kelowna Pacific Railway be returned to the band.

See also
Okanagan people

References

External links
Okanagan Indian Band Website

Okanagan
Syilx governments